Dictyocaulidae is a family of nematodes belonging to the order Rhabditida.

Genera:
 Borrellostrongylus Gutiérrez, 1945
 Bronchonema Mönnig, 1932
 Cardiostrongylus Sakamoto & Malgor, 1995
 Dictyocaulus Railliet & Henry, 1907
 Mertensinema Sharpilo, 1976

References

Nematodes